Allegory of Hercules is a c. 1535 oil on canvas painting by Dosso Dossi, now in the Uffizi in Florence. Its subject is uncertain and its sometimes almost known as Bambocciata or Stregoneria.

It was acquired in Siena by Giannotto Cennini for cardinal Leopoldo de' Medici, who received it in 1665. His inventory called it a "painting with portraits of the jesters of the dukes of Ferrara", a satirical caricature subject which can only have originated as a direct commission from Ercole II d'Este, himself named after Hercules, hence the painting's name.

References

Paintings in the collection of the Uffizi
Paintings by Dosso Dossi
1535 paintings
Allegorical paintings